Jesse Thomas Williams  ( – 20 October 1972) was a Welsh international footballer. He was part of the Wales national football team, playing 1 match on 18  April 1925 against Ireland.

He also made appearances in the Football League for Wrexham, Middlesbrough and Clapton Orient.

See also
 List of Wales international footballers (alphabetical)

References

1903 births
1972 deaths
Welsh footballers
Wales international footballers
Association football forwards
Caergwrle F.C. players
Wrexham A.F.C. players
Middlesbrough F.C. players
Leyton Orient F.C. players
Rhyl F.C. players
Ashton National F.C. players
Shrewsbury Town F.C. players
Telford United F.C. players
Colwyn Bay F.C. players